Saint-Elzéar is a municipality in Quebec, Canada.

Demographics

Population

See also
 List of municipalities in Quebec

References

Incorporated places in Gaspésie–Îles-de-la-Madeleine
Municipalities in Quebec